South Newport is an unincorporated community in McIntosh County, Georgia, in the U.S. state of Georgia.

History
A post office was in operation at South Newport between 1840 and 1950. The community takes its name from the nearby South Newport River.

References

Unincorporated communities in Georgia (U.S. state)
Unincorporated communities in McIntosh County, Georgia
Populated coastal places in Georgia (U.S. state)